Mera Saaein 2 is a 2012 Pakistani Political drama aired on ARY Digital. It is the sequel of 2011 serial Mera Saaein. It was directed by Babar Javed, produced by A & B Entertainment and written by Parisa Siddiqi Mere Saaein was also aired on Life OK in India .

Story 
For some families, evil runs in the blood. The surviving wives of Malik Wajahat, Shazmeen and Naina, have become enemies, in a constant struggle for power and control of his political party. Under the influence of their new husbands, they are determined to destroy each other. But with the return of Malik Wajhat's son, Malik Shazmaan Wajahad Hayyat, the hopes and dreams of all involved are put to the test and revenge is in the air.

Cast

Soundtrack 
Its title song was sung by Zulfiqar Ali and Shabana Kauser, lyrics by Ali Moin and composed by Waqar Ali.

References

External links 
 Official Website

Pakistani drama television series
Urdu-language television shows
Television shows set in Karachi
ARY Digital original programming
2012 Pakistani television series debuts
A&B Entertainment